Lyubini may refer to:

Lyubini, Bezhetsky District, Tver Oblast, a village in Bezhetsky District of Tver Oblast, Russia
Lyubini, Torzhoksky District, Tver Oblast, a village in Torzhoksky District of Tver Oblast, Russia